The Museum of Romanian Literature "Mihail Kogălniceanu" is a museum in Chişinău, Moldova.

Overview 

The museum was established on April 1, 1965, according to a governmental decision of the Moldovan SSR from February 10, 1965. Since the beginning, it was affiliated with the Moldovan Writers' Union. The first director was Gheorghe Cincilei (1936-1999). In 1983, the museum took the name of Dimitrie Cantemir, and in 1991 became Centrul Naţional de Studii Literare şi Muzeografie „M.Kogălniceanu”. Since 1997, the museum has operated under the name Museum of Romanian Literature "Mihail Kogălniceanu".

The museum has over 90 thousand objects: secular and religious books (16th-21st century), manuscripts, art objects, and documents. Most of the exhibited books are the editions of the Romanian classics.

Hours of service: summer: 10.00 - 18.00, winter: 9.00 – 17.00. Friday – closed.

External links 
Arcadie Suceveanu, MUZEUL LITERATURII ROMÂNE „MIHAIL KOGĂLNICEANU” 
VADEMECUM. CONTEMPORARY HISTORY MOLDOVA

Museums in Moldova
Museums established in 1965
History museums in Moldova
1965 establishments in the Moldavian Soviet Socialist Republic